Rick Brewer (born in Stanley, New Brunswick) is a New Brunswick businessman and politician, and a former assistant pastor.

Early life
Brewer was the son of Richard C. Brewer and Emma Hanson. He was an assistant pastor in the Pentecostal Church. For most of his life, Brewer has been involved in business, largely in the grocery industry. He has been involved in the grocery industry for the past 33 years, beginning with the wholesale business at Willett Foods and The Food Group Inc. He then entered the retail market as the manager and supervisor of five convenience stores.

Political career
He was elected to the Legislative Assembly of New Brunswick in the 2003 election to represent the riding of Southwest Miramichi defeating cabinet minister Norman Betts.  A Liberal, he has been the critic for the Department of Supply and Services since the election.  On July 6, 2006 he was named chair of the Opposition's Petroleum Products Pricing Task Force, established in the wake of gas price regulation taking effect in New Brunswick on July 1.

He was re-elected in the 2006 election despite a strong challenge from former MLA Brent Taylor.  Following the election, on November 7, 2006, he was named whip for the government caucus.  On November 12, 2008, he was added to the cabinet. He served as Minister of Human Resources and Minister responsible for Aboriginal Affairs until September 2010.
Presently (fall of 2010) Rick & Ruth are involved in building a school in Iquitos, Peru.
As well recently Rick received his Clergy license with Faith Christian Fellowship of Canada .

Personal life
Brewer is married with two children and operates a convenience store in Boiestown.

Notes

References

External links
The New Brunswick Liberal Association/L'Association libérale du Nouveau-Brunswick

Living people
Members of the Executive Council of New Brunswick
New Brunswick Liberal Association MLAs
21st-century Canadian politicians
Year of birth missing (living people)